Maigret and the Loner is a 1971 detective novel by the Belgian writer Georges Simenon featuring his character Jules Maigret. The book was translated into English by Howard Curtis.

References 

1971 French novels
Maigret novels
1971 Belgian novels